1977 World Masters Athletics Championships is the second in a series of World Masters Athletics Outdoor Championships (called World Masters Championships or World Veterans Championships at the time) that took place in Gothenburg, Sweden, from 8 to 13 August 1977.

The main venue was Slottsskogsvallen.

Supplemental venues included Ullevi Stadium for 5K and 10K races, the former Gothenburg-Särö railroad route for Marathon, and the park around Björngårdsvillan for Cross Country and Road Walks.

This edition of masters athletics Championships had a minimum age limit of 35 years for women and 40 years for men.

The age groups for women are now in 5-year (rather than 10-year as in 1975) divisions, same as for men.

The governing body of this series is World Association of Veteran Athletes (WAVA, initially called World Veterans Athletic Association).

WAVA was formed during meeting at the inaugural edition of this series at Toronto in 1975, then officially founded and named when its constitution was proposed during General Assembly at this edition on 9 August 1977.

WAVA was renamed as World Masters Athletics (WMA) at the Brisbane Championships in 2001.

This Championships was organized by the nascent WAVA in coordination with a Local Organising Committee (LOC) led by Roland Jerneryd.

Jerneryd was elected WAVA secretary at the General Assembly.

In addition to a full range of track and field events,

non-stadia events included 8K Cross Country and Marathon.

Controversy
A major issue at the WAVA founding was South Africa, which had been expelled by the International Amateur Athletic Federation (IAAF) in 1976 due to the apartheid policy of the South African government at that time.

The WAVA constitution was written to be independent of IAAF,

and stated that

Nevertheless, South African participation was not settled when the meet began, before the WAVA constitution was proposed, and several athletes from South Africa (and Rhodesia) registered as Americans.

The issue of South African athletes remained controversial until South Africa rejoined IAAF in 1992, after the end of the apartheid system.

Results
Past Championships results are archived at WMA.

Additional archives are available from Museum of Masters Track & Field

as a pdf book,

as a searchable pdf,

and in a pdf newsletter.

Several masters world records were set at this Championships, including M40 5k run and 3k steeplechase by 1964 Olympic gold medalist Gaston Roelants, and M40 discus by four-time Olympic Champion Al Oerter.

The blind sprinter Fritz Assmy wowed the crowd with 2 victories in the M60 100m and 200m,

guided by his son-in-law Klaus Hinrichsen in lane 8.

World records for 1977 are from WMA unless otherwise noted.

Women
No world records were reported. Among the notable performances, American Miki Gorman won the W40 1500m, 3000m, cross-country, and marathon, while Irish Maeve Kyle won the W45 in 100m, 400m, high jump and long jump.

Men

References

World Masters Athletics Championships
World Masters Athletics Championships
International athletics competitions hosted by Sweden
1977
Masters athletics (track and field) records